Mazravi (also Romanized as Mazr‘āvī and Mazrāvī; also known as Marz‘āvī and Mazerāvī) is a village in Hoseyni Rural District, in the Central District of Shadegan County, Khuzestan Province, Iran. At the 2006 census, its population was 104, in 13 families.

References 

Populated places in Shadegan County